Museum Tusculanum Press (Danish: Museum Tusculanums Forlag) is an independent academic press historically associated with the University of Copenhagen, publishing mainly in the humanities, social sciences and theology. It was founded in 1975 as a non-profit institution and publishes approximately 45 titles annually. A large part of the books published by Museum Tusculanum Press are authored or edited by researchers affiliated with the University of Copenhagen.

External links
Official website

University of Copenhagen
Book publishing companies of Denmark
Publishing companies established in 1975
University presses of Denmark
Mass media in Copenhagen
Danish companies established in 1975